Chhetan Gurung (5 February 19799 September 2020) was a Nepalese film director and writer known for his work in Nepali cinema. He has written scripts for Nepali films including November Rain (2014), Classic (2016), A Mero Hajur 3 (2019), and Prem Geet 3. Gurung debuted as a director from Damaru Ko Dandibiyo (2018), his last film, Prem Geet 3 which he directed in 2019 that will be released posthumously. He died from liver problems on 9 September 2020.

Career 

In 2014, Gurung debuted as a writer with November Rain, for which he won the NFDC National Film Award for Best Writer. In 2016, he was nominated for the NFDC National Film Award for Best Writer for Classic. In 2018, he debuted as a film director from drama Damaru Ko Dandibiyo, a film about a former national game of Nepal. Gurung said: "I have taken the film as a good project to use my experiences in the industry and to broaden my horizon. I am excited." Damaru Ko Dandibiyo was critically acclaimed, one critic praised Gurung writing that he did a "stellar job" in the film.

In 2019, Gurung wrote a script for romantic-drama A Mero Hajur 3. In 2019, Gurung directed big-budget drama Prem Geet 3, the film stars Pradeep Khadka and Kristina Gurung in the lead roles. The film was set to be released on 10 April 2020 but was postponed due to the COVID-19 pandemic. In 2020, he was working with producer Santosh Sen in comedy Hututu.

Personal life and death 
Gurung was born on 5 February 1979 (Bikram Sambat: 22 Magh 2035). He was suffering from liver problems; on 9 September 2020 he was taken to the Metro Kathmandu Hospital where he was admitted to the intensive care unit (ICU). He died the same day early in the morning.

Film producer Santosh Sen told The Himalayan Times that he had been vomiting blood. Sen added that he was previously on medication and was admitted to the ICU for liver problems. His last funeral rites were performed on 10 September at Swayambhunath; the funeral was attended by director Dayaram Dahal, actor Aaryan Sigdel, actor Pradeep Khaka, actress Jharana Thapa, Santosh Sen, and others.

Filmography

Awards

References

External links 
 

1979 births
2020 deaths
Nepalese film directors
Nepalese screenwriters
21st-century Nepalese screenwriters
21st-century Nepalese film directors
Deaths from liver disease
Gurung people